The Swilers are a Canadian rugby union team based in St. John's, Newfoundland. The team plays in the Newfoundland Rugby League and draws most of its players from the Newfoundland Rugby Union.

The Swilers play their matches at Swilers Rugby Park 100 Crosbie Road, St. John's.

External links
 

Canadian rugby union teams
Sport in St. John's, Newfoundland and Labrador
Sports teams in Newfoundland and Labrador